Stan Cowan (22 December 1931 – 8 February 2015) was a Scottish rugby union and professional rugby league footballer who played in the 1950s and 1960s.

Background
Cowan died in February 2015 after a short illness. He was 83.

Playing career

Challenge Cup Final appearances
Cowan played , i.e. number 2, in Hull FC's 13-30 defeat by Wigan in the 1959 Challenge Cup Final during the 1958–59 season at Wembley Stadium, London on Saturday 9 May 1959, in front of a crowd of 79,811, and played right-, i.e. number 3, in the 5-38 defeat by Wakefield Trinity in the 1960 Challenge Cup Final during the 1959–60 season at Wembley Stadium, London on Saturday 14 May 1960, in front of a crowd of 79,773.

County Cup Final appearances
Cowan played , i.e. number 2, in Hull FC's 14-15 defeat by Featherstone Rovers in the 1959 Yorkshire County Cup Final during at Headingley Rugby Stadium, Leeds on Saturday 31 October 1959, in front of a crowd of 23,983.

Genealogical information
Cowan was the son of the rugby union, and rugby league footballer for Hull F.C.; James "Jim"/"Jimmy" Cowan, and the older brother of the rugby union and rugby league footballer; Ronnie Cowan.

References

1931 births
2015 deaths
Hull F.C. players
Rugby league centres
Rugby league players from Selkirk, Scottish Borders
Rugby league wingers
Rugby union players from Selkirk, Scottish Borders
Scottish rugby league players
Scottish rugby union players
Selkirk RFC players
South of Scotland District (rugby union) players